Caparić is a village in Serbia. It is situated in the Ljubovija municipality, in the Mačva District of Central Serbia. The village has a Serb ethnic majority. It had a population of 448 in 2002.

Historical population

1948: 1,419
1953: 1,504
1961: 1,386
1971: 1,099
1981: 797
1991: 567
2002: 448

References

See also
List of places in Serbia

Populated places in Mačva District
Ljubovija